The Wild Tiger Corps was a national paramilitary corps founded in Thailand in 1911 by King Vajiravudh (Rama VI).  Inspired by the British Volunteer Force, the unit was intended to maintain civil order.

The Wild Tiger Corps was founded on 1 May 1911 by King Vajiravudh. The corps was meant to be a nationwide paramilitary corps, answerable only to the monarch. At first a ceremonial guard, it became a military force of 4,000 within its first year. Filled with commoners, the king would often mess with them and socialize with them openly. The corps eventually rivalled the army in strength and the civil service in influence. The king even went so far as appointing some to high ranks in the army and nobility.

The Wild Tiger Corps specialize in protecting the king and the royal family, protect the palace, hand-to-hand combat, melee combat with weapons, use of firearms, and some specialize in undercover operations in order to spy on intelligence that could pose a threat to the royal family. However, they also received combat training in infantry style such as hand and arm signals, raid, reconnaissance, and others related to infantry skills in those period.

While the king socialized with members of the corps, the regular army and aristocrats were deeply dissatisfied. Army officers were not permitted to join the organization. They saw these new appointments and the corps as a threat to the honour of the army. Combined with the king's spending on new palaces and attention on dramatic productions, the kingdom was deeply in debt and was in danger of financial collapse. This dissatisfaction partially led to the Palace Revolt of 1912.

The Wild Tigers Corps was disbanded soon after the 1912 revolt failed.

The unit brought its Thai name from the Sua Pa Maew Mong Scout Corps founded by King Naresuan around 1600.

It also included a junior division known as Luk Sua ("Tiger Cubs") based on the Boy Scout movement.

Ranks 

The Wild Tiger Corps had a ranking like military rankings.

Captain-General (นายกองใหญ่) This rank was exclusively for King Vajiravudh. But, in 1915, his majesty created a rank, General of the Wild Tiger Corps (นายพลเสือป่า) for members who are leaders of the corps. The rank was equivalent to Brigadier General.
Colonel  (นายกองเอก)
Lieutenant Colonel (นายกองโท)
Major (นายกองตรี)
Captain (นายหมวดเอก)
Lieutenant (นายหมวดโท)
Second Lieutenant (นายหมวดตรี)
Acting Second Lieutenant (ว่าที่นายหมวดตรี)
Third Lieutenant (นายหมู่ใหญ่), This rank was the lowest commission officer rank but wearing uniforms like enlist rank.
Sergeant (นายหมู่เอก), The highest rank of the enlisted.
Corporal (นายหมู่โท)
Lance Corporal (นายหมู่ตรี)
Corp (พลเสือป่า)

Legacy 
The ranks were reused in Volunteer Defense Corps but the Insignia are different.

See also
Palace Revolt of 1912
Vajiravudh
Monarchy of Thailand

References

Sources
Thai Scouting – History

Military units and formations of Thailand
Military history of Thailand
Paramilitary organizations based in Thailand
1911 establishments in Siam
1925 disestablishments
Military units and formations disestablished in 1925
Military units and formations established in 1911